Charles Clawson was an Irish Lawn bowls international who competed in the 1934 British Empire Games.

Bowls career
At the 1934 British Empire Games he won the silver medal in the rinks (fours) event with Cecil Curran, George Watson and Percy Watson.

He bowled for the Shaftesbury Bowls Club in Belfast and was the Honorary Treasurer of the Irish Bowls Association from 1933-1954. The pairs cup at the Irish National Bowls Championships is named after him.

He was twice National pairs champion with Cecil Curran in 1932 and 1939.

References

Male lawn bowls players from Northern Ireland
Bowls players at the 1934 British Empire Games
Commonwealth Games silver medallists for Northern Ireland
Commonwealth Games medallists in lawn bowls
Medallists at the 1934 British Empire Games